William D. Casey  (born February 19, 1945) is a Canadian politician from Nova Scotia who served as a Member of Parliament (MP) in the House of Commons of Canada. First elected as a Progressive Conservative in 1988, he later sat as Conservative MP following the party merger in 2003. In 2007, Casey was expelled from the party for voting against the 2007 budget, but he was reelected as an Independent in the 2008 election and sat as such until he resigned his seat in 2009 to work on behalf of the Nova Scotian government for provincial interests in Ottawa. Casey decided to return to federal politics in the 2015 federal election and running as a Liberal easily took the seat with 63.73% of the popular vote.

Life and career
 
Casey was born in Amherst, Nova Scotia. He was a car salesman and stockbroker before going into politics. He was first elected, as a member of the Progressive Conservative Party of Canada, to represent the riding of Cumberland—Colchester in the 1988 election.  In common with almost every other PC Member of Parliament (MP) in the 1993 election he lost his seat, in his case being defeated by Liberal candidate Dianne Brushett.

In the 1997 election, he retook the seat, defeating Brushett, and represented it until April 30, 2009.

In 2003, the PCs merged into the new Conservative Party.  He was the deputy whip of the Official Opposition from 2004 until the 2006 election, and had served as the Conservative critic of Transport, International Trade, National Revenue, and Foreign Affairs in the past.

When the Conservatives' 2007 budget was released, Casey praised it, saying "I have never seen a budget that has had more in it for the people of my riding than this one does."  However, on June 5, 2007, he voted against it, claiming that it broke the Atlantic Accord with his province and Newfoundland and Labrador.  He was expelled from the Conservative caucus, and sat as an Independent MP. He styled himself as an Independent Progressive Conservative.

In October 2007, the Conservative Party riding association in Cumberland—Colchester—Musquodoboit Valley renominated Casey as its candidate for the 2008 election. The party's head office refused to accept Casey's nomination, and suspended the association's board.

On January 31, 2008, Casey underwent surgery for prostate cancer. His surgery was a success and all the cancer was removed. Casey previously had to have a cancerous growth removed from his back.

On September 4, the Green Party of Canada declared its support for his candidacy and announced that they would not run a candidate against him in the 2008 election. On October 14, 2008, Casey was re-elected as an independent by winning 69% of the popular vote. His nearest opponent was Karen Olsen of the New Democrats with just 12% of the vote.

During the 2008 Canadian parliamentary dispute, Casey announced he would vote against Harper in a motion of non-confidence. He announced in January 2009 that he would not run for re-election in the next federal election  However, on April 28, 2009, Nova Scotia Premier Rodney MacDonald announced that Casey would be the senior representative for the Department of Intergovernmental Affairs in Ottawa for the province, replacing Ian Thompson. Casey officially resigned his seat April 30.

On November 18, 2014, Casey announced he was running for the Liberal nomination in his former riding for the 2015 federal election and won the nomination vote on February 28, 2015. On October 19, 2015, Casey won the election, defeating Conservative incumbent Scott Armstrong.

In September 2018, Casey announced that he would not run in the 2019 election.

In July 2021, Casey announced he would run in the next Nova Scotia general election as a candidate for the Nova Scotia Liberal Party in Cumberland North. The incumbent was former PC MLA Elizabeth Smith-McCrossin, who ran as an independent. Casey was unsuccessful losing to Smith-McCrossin.

Personal life
Casey was diagnosed with malignant melanoma in 2006 and underwent two surgeries to have the cancerous mole removed. He battled prostate cancer and underwent surgery in early February 2008.

Electoral record

References

External links

 Bill Casey

1945 births
Independent Conservative MPs in the Canadian House of Commons
Conservative Party of Canada MPs
Independent candidates in the 2008 Canadian federal election
Independent MPs in the Canadian House of Commons
Living people
Members of the House of Commons of Canada from Nova Scotia
People from Amherst, Nova Scotia
Progressive Conservative Party of Canada MPs
Liberal Party of Canada MPs
People from Cumberland County, Nova Scotia